Maurice Schwob (7 May 1859 – 30 March 1928) was a French publisher of the daily newspaper , based in Nantes. The newspaper had been sold to Maurice's father, Georges Schwob, in 1876 by Evariste Mangin.

He was born into a cultivated Jewish family. His father, George Schwob, was a friend of Théodore de Banville and Théophile Gautier. His mother, Mathilde Cahun, came from a family of intellectuals from Alsace. He was the brother of symbolist writer Marcel Schwob and the father of the surrealist writer and photographer Claude Cahun (born Lucy Schwob).

References

1859 births
1928 deaths
19th-century French Jews
19th-century French newspaper publishers (people)
20th-century French newspaper publishers (people)
French male writers